KXXZ (95.9 MHz), "El Portal 95.9") is a commercial radio station that is licensed to Barstow, California, United States. The station is owned by California Communications of Barstow, LLC and broadcasts a regional Mexican format featuring programming syndicated by ABC Radio.

History
KXXZ was first signed on in 1989 by Hub Broadcasting Inc. with an album-oriented rock format.

In 1999, Hub Broadcasting sold KXXZ to Tele-Media Broadcasting LLC, headed by Robert Tudek, for $600,000. At the time, the station aired a classic hits format.

In June 2008, Dos Costas Communications Corporation sold KXXZ and sister stations KDUC, KDUQ, and KSZL to California Communications of Barstow, LLC for $4.3 million.

References

External links

XXZ
XXZ
Barstow, California
Mass media in San Bernardino County, California
1989 establishments in California
Radio stations established in 1989